Inner Sanctum may refer to:

 Inner Sanctum (1948 film), an American film directed by Lew Landers
 Inner Sanctum (1991 film), a film starring Tanya Roberts
 Inner Sanctum (TV series), an American television series from 1954
 Inner Sanctum Mystery, a 1941-1952 American radio program, and related film and television productions
 Inner Sanctum Records, a defunct record shop in Austin, Texas, United States
 The Inner Sanctum, a 2007 album by Saxon
 Inner Sanctum (album), a 2019 live album and video by Pet Shop Boys
 "Inner Sanctum", a song by Behemoth from the 2007 album The Apostasy
 Inner Sanctum (band), a Bangalore metal band
 "Inner Sanctum", a track and limited edition single released from the 2016 Pet Shop Boys album Super
 Might and Magic Book One: The Secret of the Inner Sanctum, the first game of Might and Magic series.

See also 
 Sanctum sanctorum, a Latin phrase meaning "Holy of Holies"